Savage Sunday may refer to:

 A 1968 episode of the television series Hawaii Five-O.
 A 1975 episode of the television series Starsky & Hutch.